The Gurasada mine is a large mine in the west of Romania in Hunedoara County, 28 km north-west of Deva and 409 km northwest of the capital, Bucharest. Gurasada represents one of the largest bentonite reserve in Romania having estimated reserves of 20 million tonnes.

References 

Bentonite mines in Romania